CISC may refer to:

Caribbean Island Swimming Championships
Chongqing Iron and Steel Company
 Clean intermittent self-catheterisation, a form of urinary catheterization
Complex instruction set computer
Criminal Intelligence Service Canada
CRTC Interconnection Steering Committee